The Buckingham, formerly known as Buckingham Plaza, is a 44-story all-residential condominium designed by Fujikawa Johnson & Associates. Located on East Randolph Street in Chicago, Illinois, the building sits between the new 340 on the Park building to its west and the older Outer Drive East building to its east. Two parks, Millennium Park and Lakeshore East Park, are immediately located to The Buckingham's south and north faces respectively. It is one of the few buildings that predates the new surrounding Lakeshore East development in the New Eastside neighborhood.

There are 7 rooms located on every residential floor of the building for a total of 306 units. An indoor pool, sauna, laundry room, fitness center and open roof deck are located on the top floor. The Buckingham has 3 high-speed elevators that run the length of the building plus one elevator that runs from the first floor to each floor of the 4-story underground parking garage.

Position in Chicago's skyline
The Buckingham is east of 340 on the Park.  It appears (unlabelled) in front of Park Tower in the diagram below.

References

External links

Official Site
More Photos from Chicago Architecture

Buildings and structures in Chicago
Residential condominiums in Chicago
Residential skyscrapers in Chicago
Residential buildings completed in 1982
1980s architecture in the United States
Lakeshore East
1982 establishments in Illinois